Quivolgo Airport  is an airport serving Constitución, a Pacific coastal city in the Maule Region of Chile.

The Constitucion non-directional beacon (Ident: CTN) is located on the field.

See also

Transport in Chile
List of airports in Chile

References

External links
OpenStreetMap - Quivolgo
OurAirports - Quivolgo
FallingRain - Quivolgo Airport

Airports in Chile
Airports in Maule Region
Coasts of Maule Region